Aysit Tansel is a Turkish economist and Professor of Economics at the Middle East Technical University in Ankara. Her research revolves mainly around labour economics, with a focus on the economics of education. She ranks among the foremost Turkish economists in terms of research output.

Biography

Aysit Tansel earner her B.S. in economics and statistics from the Middle East Technical University (METU) in 1968 while on a Kennedy Scholarship, followed by a M.A. in economics from the University of Minnesota in 1972 and a PhD in economics from the Binghamton University (State University of New York) in 1979. After her PhD, she began work as an assistant professor at the State University of New York, followed by a position at Wilkes University, before moving back to METU in 1983. At METU, she was promoted to associate professor in 1986 and has been a full professor since 1994. Additionally, Tansel maintains affiliations to the IZA Institute of Labor Economics, the Economic Research Forum and the Global Labor Organization. In terms of professional service, she performs editorial duties for the journals Economics of Education Review, International Journal of Education Economics and Development and Equality, Diversity and Inclusion, among others. Besides her work on economics, Tansel has also been engaged in Turkish literature, having been a member of the Ilkyar Foundation's executive board from 1998-2009 as well as its former vice-president and being Oguz Tansel Literature Award since 2009.

Research

Aysit Tansels research interests include economic growth, gender inequality, returns to education, female labor participation, brain drain, internal migration and various topics related to health economics. According to IDEAS/RePEc, Aysit Tansel belongs to the top 6% of economists in terms of research output. In particular, topics of her research include the determinants of job satisfaction in Britain, the determinants of school attainment of boys and girls as well as the demand for education in Turkey, the effect of disease on wages and labour supply as well as the link between schooling, parental education and gender in Côte d'Ivoire and Ghana, and the relationship between the choice of public vs private sector employment and gender wage differentials as well as the link between wage employment, earnings and returns to schooling for men and women in Turkey,

References

External links
 IZA profile of Aysit Tansel
 Google Scholar page of Aysit Tansel

Year of birth missing (living people)
Living people
Turkish women economists
Labor economists
Education economists
Academic staff of Middle East Technical University
Binghamton University alumni
University of Minnesota College of Liberal Arts alumni
Middle East Technical University alumni
20th-century Turkish economists
21st-century Turkish economists